Electric railways in Sweden are powered from a single-phase AC supply of 15 kV at  Hz, as used in Germany, Austria and Switzerland.  Unlike these countries, the 132 kV traction current grid covers only part of the country,  approximately north of Stockholm. This grid is fed by frequency converters and has no generation nor transmission lines from Norway, which uses the same traction current system. Formerly, the Porjus Hydroelectric Power Station provided electric power to the traction network. In the future the Älvkarleby Hydroelectric Power Station may be connected to the traction network, as this would increase stability of the power grid of the railway system.
Separate from the 132 kV grid is a 30 kV line connection between Mon and Varp substation north of Gothenburg.

Also the overhead wire system has some differences. It is common, that the pylons for the overhead wire also carry a three phase AC system. In order to reduce counts of substations, the voltage at the substations for the overhead wire is 32 kV at some lines (AT-System). However trains require 16 kV and therefore auto transformers are used, which have a central connection connected with the grounded railway, while the other connections are connected to the 32 kV output. The voltage between this central connection to the phase is 16 kV. The other pole to ground is also 16 kV, but with opposite polarity and runs along the track on the overhead wires until separation section. Other lines are fed directly with 16 kV from the substations. However differential transformers are used for feeding, in order to eliminate jamming signals.

Sites

Decentralized Converter Stations 
Converter Stations only feeding power into overhead wire.

Centralized Converter Stations 
Converter Stations, which also feed power into 132 kV single phase AC grid.

Substations 
Substations fed from 132 kV single phase AC grid.

30 kV-line Mon-Varp 
Endpoints of 30 kV-interconnection Mon-Varp.

Other remarkable points 
Crossing-point of traction current power line and HVDC Fenno-Skan 2 (only crossing point of HVDC overhead line and single-phase AC overhead powerline in the world): .

The railway on the Öresund bridge is fed with Danish standard voltage, 25 kV 50 Hz AC, along around 6 km within Swedish borders. The power is supplied from Denmark. The system limit is at Lernacken, near the bridge abutment.

Two local railways in Stockholm County, Roslagsbanan and Saltsjöbanan, as well as Stockholm Metro and all tramways are run on DC power.

External links 
 Explanation 
 https://web.archive.org/web/20110719062453/http://www.ee.kth.se/php/modules/publications/reports/2010/IR-EE-ES_2010_006.pdf
 http://www.nth.se/nb/banmatningssystem_nb_web.pdf

Electric power distribution
Electric power infrastructure in Sweden
Electric railways in Sweden
Sweden
Traction power networks
Sweden
Rail transport-related lists
Sweden transport-related lists

sv:Matning av kontaktledning